Maciel Luiz Franco (born 15 March 1972 in Bandeira do Sul), also known as Maciel, is a Brazilian former professional football player. He is considered one of the best foreign players in the K-League.

Career

Chunnam Dragons
Maciel spent seven years playing for South Korean K-League club Chunnam Dragons, from 1997 to 2003. He was awarded K-League Best Eleven for four straight seasons and won the K-League Best Defender of the Year in the 1998 season. He wanted to gain Korean citizenship before the 2002 FIFA World Cup, but abandoned his attempt eventually.

Club career statistics

References

External links
 
 

1972 births
Living people
Association football defenders
Brazilian footballers
Brazilian expatriate footballers
União São João Esporte Clube players
Jeonnam Dragons players
K League 1 players
Expatriate footballers in South Korea
Brazilian expatriate sportspeople in South Korea